"I Don't Like Mondays" is a song by Irish new wave group the Boomtown Rats about the 1979 Cleveland Elementary School shooting in San Diego. It was released in 1979 as the lead single from their third album, The Fine Art of Surfacing. The song was a number-one single in the UK Singles Chart for four weeks during the summer of 1979, and ranks as the sixth-biggest hit of the UK in 1979. Written by Bob Geldof and Johnnie Fingers, the piano ballad was the band's second single to reach number one on the UK chart.

Background and writing 

According to Geldof, he wrote the song after reading a telex report at Georgia State University's campus radio station, WRAS, on the shooting spree of 16-year-old Brenda Ann Spencer, who fired at children in a school playground at Grover Cleveland Elementary School in San Diego, California, on 29 January 1979, killing two adults and injuring eight children and one police officer. Spencer showed no remorse for her crime; her explanation for her actions was "I don't like Mondays. This livens up the day". Geldof had been contacted by Steve Jobs to play a gig for Apple, inspiring the opening line about a "silicon chip". The song was first performed less than a month later.

Geldof explained how he wrote the song:

I was doing a radio interview in Atlanta with Johnnie Fingers and there was a telex machine beside me. I read it as it came out. Not liking Mondays as a reason for doing somebody in is a bit strange. I was thinking about it on the way back to the hotel and I just said 'silicon chip inside her head had switched to overload'. I wrote that down. And the journalists interviewing her said, 'Tell me why?' It was such a senseless act. It was the perfect senseless act and this was the perfect senseless reason for doing it. So perhaps I wrote the perfect senseless song to illustrate it. It wasn't an attempt to exploit tragedy.

Geldof had originally intended the song as a B-side, but changed his mind after the song was successful with audiences on the Rats' US tour. Spencer's family tried to prevent the single from being released in the United States, but were unsuccessful.

In later years, Geldof admitted that he regretted writing the song because he "made Brenda Spencer famous".

In 2019 Bob Geldof and Johnnie Fingers reached an agreement in their dispute over who wrote the song, until then credited solely to Geldof. Fingers received a financial settlement and co-credit.

Chart performance 

Despite reaching number-one in the United Kingdom, it only reached number 73 on the US Billboard Hot 100.

In the UK the song won the Best Pop Song and Outstanding British Lyric categories at the Ivor Novello Awards.

Weekly charts

Year-end charts

Live performances 

On 9 September 1981, Geldof was joined on stage by fellow Boomtown Rat Johnnie Fingers to perform the song for The Secret Policeman's Ball sponsored by Amnesty International.  A recording of that performance appears on the 1982 album The Secret Policeman's Other Ball.

The Boomtown Rats performed the song for Live Aid at Wembley Stadium in 1985. This was the band's final major appearance. On singing the line, "And the lesson today is how to die", Geldof paused for 20 seconds while the crowd applauded the significance to those starving in Africa that Live Aid was intended to help.

At a concert in London in 1995, almost ten years later to the day, Bon Jovi covered the song after being joined on stage by Geldof at Wembley Stadium. This recorded performance features on Bon Jovi's live album One Wild Night Live 1985–2001, as well as on the bonus 2-CD edition of These Days. Bon Jovi was again joined by Geldof for a performance of the song at The O2 Arena on 23 June 2010, the 10th night of their 12-night residency.

"I Don't Like Mondays" was subsequently covered by Tori Amos on her 2001 album Strange Little Girls and later by G4 on their 2006 album Act Three.

Music video

A music video directed by David Mallet was used to promote the song. The video begins with the Boomtown Rats performing in a choir with children in the pews miming the chorus ("Tell Me Why?"). It then cuts to a family living room with the daughter just coming back from school but here the chorus is mimed by the other three band members to lead singer Bob Geldof. It then transitions to a soft piano fill with Geldof in front of a white background wearing sunglasses singing the final verse of the single version. After the line "And the lesson today is how to die" a series of jump cuts of Geldof quickly appear before he sings the last few lines. Afterwards the final chorus is presented this time mimed with the same children from the beginning. The clip ends with the Boomtown Rats looking at a chroma key image of a house in a grassy plain.

See also
 List of 1970s one-hit wonders in the United States

References 

1979 singles
European Hot 100 Singles number-one singles
Irish Singles Chart number-one singles
Songs based on actual events
Songs inspired by deaths
Songs about school
Songs about the media
Songs written by Bob Geldof
The Boomtown Rats songs
Murder ballads
1970s ballads
UK Singles Chart number-one singles
Song recordings produced by Phil Wainman
1979 songs
Ensign Records singles
Columbia Records singles
Music videos directed by David Mallet (director)
Number-one singles in South Africa
Number-one singles in Australia
Works about school violence